Westcliff railway station is on the London, Tilbury and Southend line, serving the locality of Westcliff-on-Sea in Southend-on-Sea, Essex. Its three-letter station code is WCF.

It was opened in 1895 by the London, Tilbury and Southend Railway. The station and all trains serving it are currently operated by c2c.

Description 
The main ticket office is located on the London-bound side of the station, leading to platform 1. It has two serving positions and uses the Tribute ticket issuing system. Outside the main ticket office is a self-service ticket machine. A second, smaller ticket office is on the country-bound platform 2, but is not currently in use.

Facilities at the station include a bicycle rack, a taxicab stand, and a car park with 50 spaces and three disabled spaces. It was extensively improved between 2004 and 2006 in a £500,000 refurbishment project by a partnership between c2c and Southend Borough Council in order to attract more people to travel by rail.

Services 

The typical off-peak service frequency is:

 4 tph (trains per hour) westbound towards London Fenchurch Street, of which:
2 tph call at all stations via 
2 tph call at all stations via the  branch
 4 tph eastbound towards , of which:
 2 tph terminate at 
 2 tph continue to Shoeburyness

References

External links 

Railway stations in Essex
DfT Category F1 stations
Railway stations in Southend-on-Sea
Former London, Tilbury and Southend Railway stations
Railway stations in Great Britain opened in 1895
Railway stations served by c2c
Buildings and structures in Southend-on-Sea